Tarmuwa is a Local Government Area in Yobe State, Nigeria.

It has an area of 4,594 km and a population of 177,204 at the 2006 census.

The postal code of the area is 620.

Tarmuwa Town is under the leadership of Mashio Kingdom by Jajere Emirate Administration. And Jajere Emirate is situated in the heart of Yobe State. It is surrounded to the north by Bursari Local Gov't, Jakusko Local Gov't to the North West and Damaturu Local Gov't The State Capital. To the South Potiskum and Nangere Local Gov't Area to the West.

Jajere Emirate was created in 1992 by the civilian administration of Governor Bukar Abba Ibrahim (FNIQS). The headquarters was located at Jajere Town  but was later dissolved by the Military Administration Compol Dabo Aliyu in 1993.
On 6 January 2000 with the return of civilian administration under the leadership of Governor Bukar Abba Ibrahim recreated the present Jajere Emirate comprising: Jajere, Mashio, Biriri, Zogoto, Muri, Koriyel, Mafa, Sungul and Koka District with 
headquarters at Babban gida.

The members of the Emirate consist of twenty title holders including the Emir. 
The present Jajere Emirate Council was installed as second class status in 1993 but later it was elevated to first class status in 2005 by the state governor Bukar Abba. The present Emir Mai Hamza Ibn Buba Mashio succeeded his late father as second Emir in 2001.

See also 
 List of Local Government Areas in Yobe State

References

Local Government Areas in Yobe State